Somnium: A Dancer's Dream was a dance show directed and choreographed by Neil Jones. The show tells the life story of Neil Jones and Katya Jones beginning with their respective childhoods, moving through to the moment they first met and finally to how together they became World Latin Showdance Champions. The show was performed at Sadler's Wells Theatre in 2019.

Synopsis 
The show moves briefly through the lives of the couple's parents, the birth of Neil and Katya in the north of England and St Petersburg respectively, and their first meeting at Blackpool Tower Ballroom. It then covers an accelerated journey of their dating while competing to their eventual win of the World Latin Showdance Championships.

The show’s choreography incorporates many dance styles including contemporary, commercial and hip-hop as well as Ballroom, Jive and Latin. It also features popular dances such as the floss.

Production History 
The show was originally created for the Lichfield Festival before being reworked for the London run.

It marked the first time a predominantly Latin and Ballroom show had been performed at Sadler's Wells Theatre, as well as the first time any of the Strictly Come Dancing professionals had performed their own show at the venue.

The show was produced by The Joneses’ Ltd. with direction & choreography by Neil Jones, and costume design & musical arrangements by Katya Jones. Lighting design was by Elliot Griggs with set design by Mick Hurd. Ian Banham was the assistant to the director and choreographer. General management was by Mildred Yuan with Charlotte Edwards as production assistant. Production management was by Digby Robinson with Harry Blumenau Casting as the Children's Administrator. The 2nd Assistants to the director were Nicole Romasz and, for the children's cast, Emily Charlton.

Cast  

 Neil Jones
 Katya Jones
 Charles Venn as Richard Porter (Katya & Neil’s coach & mentor)
 Chris Arias
 Renato Barros Nobre
 Jeremy Basile
 Kate Basile
 Ellie Beacock
 Michael Danilczuk
 Kerri Ann Donaldson
 Domenico Palmisano
 Luke Miller
 Jowita Przystał
 Korina Travis
Jasmine Ambrose-Brown
Neath Champion-Weeks
Millie Collyer
Alexandra Cook
Rebecca Hastings
Lori Hopkinson
Lauren Howse
Sophie Hurley
Maddy Lee
Beatrice Little
Jessica Maynard
Lottie-Rose Netherwood
Lizzie Tsareva
Rosie Winter
Stalo Zachariou
Students of The Vale School Of Dance
 Students of Allstarz Academy & Dance Connection (on alternating nights)

Reviews 
The show received mostly positive reviews that praised the cast and the quality of the dance numbers. The plot and story arc received mixed reviews

References 

Ballroom dance
Strictly Come Dancing
2019 ballet premieres